Paul the Puppeteer is an 1874 novella by the German writer Theodor Storm. It is about a Frisian woodturner who tells the story of how he got his nickname.

An English translation by Denis Jackson was published in 2004. The story has been adapted for film multiple times.

Film adaptations
 1935 – Pole Poppenspäler, directed by Curt Oertel
 1944/1945 – Der Puppenspieler, directed by Alfred Braun, left unfinished
 1954 – Pole Poppenspäler, directed by Arthur Pohl
 1968 – Pole Poppenspäler, directed by Günther Anders
 1988 – Pole Poppenspäler, directed by Guy Kubli

References

External links
 Pole Poppenspäler at Projekt Gutenberg-DE 

1874 German novels
German novellas
German novels adapted into films
German-language novels
Novels by Theodor Storm